The Tennessee Conference is an Annual Conference (a regional episcopal area, similar to a diocese) of the United Methodist Church. This conference serves the congregations in Middle Tennessee. The Tennessee Conference falls within the Nashville Episcopal Area which also includes the Memphis Conference. The Tennessee Conference is part of the Southeastern Jurisdictional Conference, and is over seen by resident Bishop Reverend Bill McAllily. Bishop McAlilly was elected to this post in 2012. The episcopal office is located in downtown Nashville at 1908 Grand Avenue, Nashville, TN 37212.

The conference's administrative offices are located at 304 S. Perimeter Park Dr. Nashville, TN 37211. The following offices are located at the conference center:

Administration & Finance for the Tennessee Conference, Suite 4
Connectional Ministries for the Tennessee Conference, Suite 1
Office of Leadership Formation and Development for the Memphis and Tennessee Conferences, Suite 6
United Methodist Foundation for the Memphis and Tennessee Conferences, Suite 3

The mission of the Tennessee Conference is to discover, equip, connect, and send lay and clergy leaders who shape congregations that offer Jesus Christ to a hurting world one neighborhood at a time.

The Tennessee Conference maintains two campground/retreat centers:
Beersheba Springs Assembly, Beersheba Springs, Tennessee
Cedar Crest Camp, Lyles, TN

Districts
The Tennessee Conference is further subdivided into 5 smaller regions, called "districts," which provide further administrative functions for the operation of local churches in cooperation with each other. This structure is vital to Methodism, and is referred to as connectionalism. The districts and leadership that comprise the Tennessee Conference are:

Caney Fork River District
271 East Ninth St.

Cookeville, TN 38501

Phone: 931.526.1343

Toll Free: 800.252.9865

District Superintendent: Rev. Donna Paramore

District Leadership Strategist: Rev. Ricky Lee

Administrative Assistant: Barbara Zimmerman

Office Email: caneyforkriver@tnumc.org

Cumberland River District
35 A Executive Park Drive

Hendersonville, TN 37075

Phone: 615.822.1433

District Superintendent: Rev. Scott Aleridge

District Leadership Strategist: Rev. Charles Smith

Administrative Assistant: Robin Stanfield

Office Email: cumberlandriver@tnumc.org

Harpeth River District
210 S. 3rd Street

Pulaski, TN 38478

Phone: 931.363.8981

Fax: 931.363.8915

District Superintendent: Rev. Allen Black

District Leadership Strategist: Rev. Judy Stevenson

Administrative Assistant: Sandy Oliver

Office Email: harpethriver@tnumc.org

Red River District
PO Box 847

Clarksville, TN 37041

Phone: 931.553.8401

Fax: 931.647.4420

District Superintendent: Pat Freudenthal

District Leadership Strategist: Rev. Lisa Martin

Administrative Assistant: Celena Spiva

Office Email: redriver@tnumc.org

Stones River District
319 Hickerson Dr., Suite B

Murfreesboro, TN 37129

Phone: 615.893.5886

Toll-Free: 800.281.0572

District Superintendent: Rev. Chip Hunter

District Leadership Strategist: Rev. Whitney Mitchell

Administrative Assistant: Monica Butler

Office Email: stonesriver@tnumc.org

Churches in the Nashville Episcopal Area include:

Aldersgate United Methodist Church, Nashville
Antioch United Methodist Church, Antioch
Arlington United Methodist Church, Nashville
Belle Meade United Methodist Church, Nashville
Bellevue United Methodist Church, Nashville
Bellshire United Methodist Church, Nashville
Belmont United Methodist Church, Nashville
Blakemore United Methodist Church, Nashville
Braden United Methodist Church, Nashville
Brentwood United Methodist Church, Brentwood
Brooks Memorial Union Methodist Church, Nashville
Calvary United Methodist Church, Nashville
Centenary United Methodist Church, Nashville
Christ United Methodist Church, Franklin
City Road Chapel United Methodist Church, Madison
Clark Memorial United Methodist Church, Nashville
Connection United Methodist Church, Nashville
Crievewood United Methodist Church, Nashville
Dalewood United Methodist Church, Nashville
Dixon Memorial United Methodist Church, Nashville
Donelson Heights United Methodist Church, Nashville
East End United Methodist Church, Nashville
Edgehill United Methodist Church, Nashville
Forest Hills United Methodist Church, Brentwood
Glencliff United Methodist Church, Nashville
Glendale United Methodist Church, Nashville
Gordon Memorial United Methodist Church, Nashville
Hamilton United Methodist Church, Antioch
Hillcrest United Methodist Church, Nashville
Hobson United Methodist Church, Nashville
John Wesley United Methodist Church, Nashville
Johnson's Chapel United Methodist Church, Brentwood
Jordonia United Methodist Church, Nashville
Liberty United Methodist Church, Brentwood
McKendree United Methodist Church, Nashville
Monroe Street United Methodist Church, Nashville
Mount Pisgah United Methodist Church, Nashville
Nancy Webb Kelly United Methodist Church, Nashville
Nashville Korean United Methodist Church, Brentwood
New Bethel United Methodist Church, Nashville
Patterson Memorial United Methodist Church, Nashville
Pennington United Methodist Church, Nashville
Primera Iglesia Metodista Hispana, Nashville
Scottsboro United Methodist Church, Nashville
Seay Hubbard United Methodist Church, Nashville
St. John's United Methodist Church, Nashville
Trinity Church, Spring Hill
West End United Methodist Church, Nashville
Woodbine United Methodist Church, Nashville

See also 

Annual Conferences of the United Methodist Church
Tennessee Conference Staff
John Abernathy Smith Heritage Center (formally Archives & History)
Camp & Retreat Ministries
Disaster Response for Memphis & Tennessee

External links
Tennessee Conference of The United Methodist Church
The United Methodist Church
The Social Principles of the United Methodist Church

Methodism in Tennessee
United Methodism by region
United Methodist Annual Conferences
Religion in Tennessee